Zhytomyr Oblast is subdivided into districts (raions) which are subdivided into territorial communities (hromadas).

Current

On 18 July 2020, the number of districts was reduced to four. These are:
 Berdychiv (Бердичівський район), the center is in the town of Berdychiv;
 Korosten (Коростенський район), the center is in the town of Korosten;
 Zhytomyr (Житомирський район), the center is in the city of Zhytomyr.
 Zviahel (Звягельський район), formerly Novohrad-Volynskyi Raion, the center is in the town of Zviahel (formerly Novohrad-Volynskyi);

Administrative divisions until 2020

In 2020, Zhytomyr Oblast was subdivided into 28 regions: 23 districts (raions) and 5 city municipalities (mis'krada or misto), officially known as territories governed by city councils.

Cities under the oblast's jurisdiction:
Zhytomyr (Житомир), the administrative center of the oblast
Berdychiv (Бердичів)
Korosten (Коростень)
Malyn (Малин)
Novohrad-Volynskyi (Новоград-Волинський)
Districts (raions):
Andrushivka (Андрушівський район)
Cities and towns under the district's jurisdiction:
Andrushivka (Андрушівка)
Urban-type settlements under the district's jurisdiction:
Chervone (Червоне)
Baranivka (Баранівський район)
Cities and towns under the district's jurisdiction:
Baranivka (Баранівка)
Urban-type settlements under the district's jurisdiction:
Dovbysh (Довбиш)
Kamianyi Brid (Кам'яний Брід)
Maryanivka (Мар'янівка)
Pershotravensk (Першотравенськ)
Polianka (Полянка)
Berdychiv (Бердичівський район)
Urban-type settlements under the district's jurisdiction:
Hryshkivtsi (Гришківці)
Brusyliv (Брусилівський район)
Urban-type settlements under the district's jurisdiction:
Brusyliv (Брусилів)
Cherniakhiv (Черняхівський район)
Urban-type settlements under the district's jurisdiction:
Cherniakhiv (Черняхів)
Holovyne (Головине)
Chudniv (Чуднівський район)
Cities and towns under the district's jurisdiction:
Chudniv (Чуднів)
Urban-type settlements under the district's jurisdiction:
Ivanopil (Іванопіль)
Vakulenchuk (Вакуленчук)
Velyki Korovyntsi (Великі Коровинці)
Khoroshiv (Володарсько-Волинський район), formerly Volodarsk-Volynskyi Raion
Urban-type settlements under the district's jurisdiction:
Irshansk (Іршанськ)
Khoroshiv (Хорошiв)
Nova Borova (Нова Борова)
Korosten (Коростенський район)
Korostyshiv (Коростишівський район)
Cities and towns under the district's jurisdiction:
Korostyshiv (Коростишів)
Liubar (Любарський район)
Urban-type settlements under the district's jurisdiction:
Liubar (Любар)
Luhyny (Лугинський район)
Urban-type settlements under the district's jurisdiction:
Luhyny (Лугини)
Myroliubiv (Миролюбів), formerly Zhovtneve
Malyn (Малинський район)
Urban-type settlements under the district's jurisdiction:
Chopovychi (Чоповичі)
Hranitne (Гранітне)
Narodychi (Народицький район)
Urban-type settlements under the district's jurisdiction:
Narodychi (Народичі)
Novohrad-Volynskyi (Новоград-Волинський район)
Urban-type settlements under the district's jurisdiction:
Horodnytsia (Городниця)
Olevsk (Олевський район)
Cities and towns under the district's jurisdiction:
Olevsk (Олевськ)
Urban-type settlements under the district's jurisdiction:
Buchmany (Бучмани)
Dibrova (Діброва)
Druzhba (Дружба)
Novi Bilokorovychi (Нові Білокоровичі)
Novoozerianka (Новоозерянка)
Ovruch (Овруцький район)
Cities and towns under the district's jurisdiction:
Ovruch (Овруч)
Urban-type settlements under the district's jurisdiction:
Pershotravneve (Першотравневе)
Popilnia (Попільнянський район)
Urban-type settlements under the district's jurisdiction:
Kornyn (Корнин)
Popilnia (Попільня)
Pulyny (Пулинський район), formerly Chervonoarmiisk Raion 
Urban-type settlements under the district's jurisdiction:
Pulyny (Пулини), formerly Chervonoarmiisk
Radomyshl (Радомишльський район)
Cities and towns under the district's jurisdiction:
Radomyshl (Радомишль)
Urban-type settlements under the district's jurisdiction:
Bila Krynytsia (Біла Криниця)
Horodok (Городок)
Romaniv (Романівський район)
Urban-type settlements under the district's jurisdiction:
Bykivka (Биківка)
Myropil (Миропіль)
Romaniv (Романів)
Ruzhyn (Ружинський район)
Urban-type settlements under the district's jurisdiction:
Ruzhyn (Ружин)
Yemilchyne (Ємільчинський район)
Urban-type settlements under the district's jurisdiction:
Yablunets (Яблунець)
Yemilchyne (Ємільчине)
Zhytomyr (Житомирський район)
Urban-type settlements under the district's jurisdiction:
Huiva (Гуйва)
Novohuivynske (Новогуйвинське)
Ozerne (Озерне)

References

Zhytomyr
Zhytomyr Oblast